Dan Casey may refer to:
 Dan Casey (baseball)
 Dan Casey (footballer)

See also
 Daniel Casey, English actor
 Daniel Casey (screenwriter), American screenwriter